DXAC (93.1 FM), broadcasting as Q Radio 93.1, is a radio station owned by Mareco Broadcasting Network and operated by Horizon of the Sun Communications. The station's studio and transmitter are located along Broadcast Ave., Shrine Hills, Matina, Davao City.

History

The station was established in 1997 as 93.1 Crossover with a Smooth AC format. At that time, it was formerly owned by Golden Broadcast Professionals, with Mareco Broadcasting Network operating the station through an airtime lease. By the late 2000s, MBNI fully acquired the station. In 2016, the station moved from F. Valrose Bldg. along C. M. Recto St. to its current home in Shrine Hills.

At the end of 2019, Horizon of the Sun Communications (producers of Chinatown TV and Chinese News TV) took over the operations of MBNI's stations. It was only on November 16, 2020, when all MBNI provincial stations started carrying the Q Radio brand and adopted a CHR/Top 40 format, similar to its Manila flagship station.

References

Radio stations in Davao City
Contemporary hit radio stations in the Philippines
Radio stations established in 1997